Edward White Robertson (June 13, 1823 – August 2, 1887) was a United States representative from Louisiana. He was also the father of Samuel Matthews Robertson.

Early years
He was born near Nashville, Tennessee. Robertson moved with his parents to Iberville Parish, Louisiana in 1825. He attended the country schools and the preparatory department of Centenary College, Jackson, Louisiana and he attended Augusta College in Kentucky, in 1842. Later, he entered Nashville University and commenced the study of law in 1845.

Early career
Robertson served in the Mexican–American War in 1846 as orderly sergeant in the Second Regiment, Louisiana Volunteers. After the war, he served as a member of the Louisiana House of Representatives 1847–1849. He later graduated from the law department of the University of Louisiana in 1850. He was admitted to the bar the same year and practiced in Iberville and East Baton Rouge Parishes before he was again elected to the Louisiana House of Representatives in 1853. In addition, he served as the Louisiana state Auditor of Public Accounts 1857–1862.

Congress
Robertson entered the Confederate army during the American Civil War in March 1862 as captain of a company which he had raised for the Twenty-seventh Regiment, Louisiana Infantry. Later, he resumed the practice of law in Baton Rouge. Elected as a Democrat, he served in the Forty-fifth, Forty-sixth, and Forty-seventh Congresses (March 4, 1877 – March 3, 1883). In Congress, he served as chairman, Committee on the Mississippi Levees (Forty-fifth Congress), and as a member Committee on Levees and Improvements of the Mississippi River (Forty-sixth Congress). He was unsuccessful candidate for renomination in 1882 to the Forty-eighth Congress. He was elected to the Fiftieth Congress and served from March 4, 1887, until his death.

Death
Robertson died in Baton Rouge, Louisiana on August 2, 1887. He was buried in Magnolia Cemetery in Baton Rouge, Louisiana.

See also

List of United States Congress members who died in office (1790–1899)

References

External links

Tulane University Law School alumni
Politicians from Nashville, Tennessee
1823 births
1887 deaths
Democratic Party members of the United States House of Representatives from Louisiana
19th-century American politicians
Burials at Magnolia Cemetery (Baton Rouge, Louisiana)
Augusta College (Kentucky) alumni